A lictor (possibly from , "to bind") was a Roman civil servant who was an attendant and bodyguard to a magistrate who held imperium. Lictors are documented since the Roman Kingdom, and may have originated with the Etruscans.

Origin

The lictors were instituted by Rome's first king, Romulus, who appointed twelve lictors to attend him. Livy refers to two competing traditions for the reason that Romulus chose that number of lictors. The first version is that twelve was the number of birds that appeared in the augury, which had portended the kingdom to Romulus. The second version, favoured by Livy, is that the number of lictors was borrowed from the Etruscan kings, who had one lictor appointed from each of their twelve states.

Eligibility
Originally, lictors were chosen from the plebeians, but through most of Roman history, they seemed to have been freedmen. Centurions from the legions were also automatically eligible to become lictors on retirement from the army. They were, however, definitely Roman citizens, since they wore togas inside Rome. A lictor had to be a strongly built man, capable of physical work. Lictors were exempted from military service, received a fixed salary (of 600 sesterces, in the beginning of the Empire), and were organized in a corporation. Usually, they were personally chosen by the magistrate they were supposed to serve, but it is also possible that they were drawn by lots.

Lictors were associated with Comitia Curiata and, probably, one was originally selected from each curia, since there were originally 30 curiae and 30 lictors (24 for the two consuls and six for the sole praetor).

Tasks

The lictor's main task was to attend as bodyguards to magistrates who held imperium. They carried rods decorated with fasces and, outside the pomerium, with axes that symbolized the power to carry out capital punishment. Dictatorial lictors had axes even within the pomerium. They followed the magistrate wherever he went, including the Forum, his house, temples, and the baths. Lictors were organized in an ordered line before him, with the primus lictor (the principal lictor) directly in front of him, waiting for orders. If there was a crowd, the lictors opened the way and kept their master safe, pushing all aside except for Roman matrons, who were accorded special honor. They also had to stand beside the magistrate whenever he addressed the crowd. Magistrates could only dispense with their lictors if they were visiting a free city or addressing a higher status magistrate. Lictors also had legal and penal duties; they could, at their master's command, arrest Roman citizens and punish them. A Vestal Virgin was accorded a lictor when her presence was required at a public ceremony.

The degree of magistrate's imperium was symbolised by the number of lictors escorting him:

Dictator: 24 lictors outside the pomerium, 12 inside. The latter rule was ignored beginning with the dictatorship of Sulla
Emperor: originally 12 lictors, after Domitian 24 lictors
Rex and Consul: 12 lictors
Proconsul: 11 lictors
Magister equitum: 6 lictors
Praetor: 6 lictors, 2 within the pomerium
Propraetor and Legatus: 5 lictors
Curule aediles: 2 lictors
Quaestor: 0 lictors in the city of Rome, but quaestors were permitted to have fasces in the provinces.
Judge: 1 lictor

Sometimes, lictors were ascribed to private citizens on special occasions, such as funerals or political reunions, as a show of respect by the city.

Lictor curiatus

The lictor curiatus (plural lictores curiati) was a special kind of lictor who did not carry rods or fasces and whose main tasks were religious. There were approximately thirty of them, serving at the command of the pontifex maximus, the high priest of Rome. They were present at sacrifices where they carried or guided sacrificial animals to the altars. Vestal Virgins, flamines (priests), and other high-ranking priests were entitled to be escorted and protected by lictores curiati. In the Empire, women of the imperial family were usually followed by two of this kind of lictor. The lictores curiati were also responsible to summon the Comitia Curiata (the Public Assembly) and to maintain order during its procedures.

See also
 Cursus honorum
 Praetorian Guard

References
Citations

Sources

External links 
 

Ancient Roman titles
Articles needing expert attention from March 2012